Daniel Francis Croll (born 18 July 1990) is a British singer-songwriter. He began his career in 2011 when he was named Songwriter of the Year by the Musicians' Benevolent Fund while attending the Liverpool Institute for Performing Arts. His debut album Sweet Disarray was released in 2014 by the Universal Music Group subsidiaries Deram Records/Decca Records (UK) and Capitol Records (US). Since that time, he has released a number of works with Communion Music including the studio albums Emerging Adulthood (2017) and Grand Plan (2020). Since 2018, he has been based in the United States.

Career

Early career
Born in Newcastle-under-Lyme in Staffordshire, Croll moved to Liverpool when he was 18 to attend the Liverpool Institute for Performing Arts (LIPA). While at LIPA, he won the national Songwriter of the Year award from the Musicians' Benevolent Fund and was one of eight students picked to have a one-to-one with LIPA founder Sir Paul McCartney.

2012–2015: Sweet Disarray

Croll signed to Turn First Records at the start of 2012. His debut single, "From Nowhere," was released worldwide on 24 September 2012 via Turn First / Racquet Records (Croll's own imprint) as a digital download and limited 7". "From Nowhere" spent 3 days at the top of the Hype Machine popular charts, was playlisted in the UK on BBC 6 Music, XFM and Amazing Radio, and received spot plays on BBC Radio 1. The song also received airplay in the US, reaching #36 on the Billboard Alternative chart. Croll was named a Guardian New Band of the Day in November 2012 and described as "Paul Simon jamming with Prince. Very nice".

Croll released his second single "Compliment Your Soul" in March 2013. This was followed up by the release of "In/Out" in July 2013.

On 13 October 2013, Croll released the song "Home" on his own VEVO channel on YouTube. On 29 October 2013, during an on-air Virgin Radio interview, Croll confirmed he had finished recording his full-length debut album. The LP was expected to be released early in 2014.

His song "Compliment Your Soul" was included in the soundtrack for the video game FIFA 14.

On 19 April 2014 for Record Store Day, Croll released a limited 10" orange vinyl featuring 2 unreleased songs. Side A featured "Hello My Baby" (featuring Ladysmith Black Mambazo) which was backed with "Ever at Your Side". Croll went to Durban to record "Hello My Baby" with the group. The limited vinyl was released in independent record stores on the day.

2015–present: Subsequent releases 
In September 2015, Croll released the single "One of Us." In June 2016, Croll announced that he had signed with Communion Music.

The electro-song "Swim" was released on 25 August 2016 through the label. The music video for "Swim" was released on 31 August 2016. Croll's second studio album Emerging Adulthood was released on 21 July 2017. The album was produced by Ben H. Allen.

In 2018, Croll relocated from Liverpool to Los Angeles. In 2019/2020, he began working with producer Matthew E. White at his Spacebomb Studios in Richmond, Virginia. In early 2020, multiple new songs were released, and a third album named Grand Plan was announced on 15 April via social media. It was released on 21 August 2020. In 2021, he released a live version of the album, recorded at Spacebomb. Later that year, Croll released the four-track EP On Top. Released in July 2021 via Communion, it was also produced and recorded with Matthew E. White.

Discography

Studio albums

Studio EPs

Live albums

Remix albums 

 In / Out (Turnfirst / Decca, 2013)
Nobody Knows (Remixes) (Decca, 2014)
Home (Remixes) (Decca, 2014)
From Nowhere (Remixes) (Decca, 2014)
 Tokyo EP (2017)

Singles

Guest appearances

References

External links

1990 births
Living people
British male singer-songwriters
People from Newcastle-under-Lyme
Alumni of the Liverpool Institute for Performing Arts
21st-century British singers
21st-century British male singers